Wix.com Ltd. is an Israeli software company, publicly listed in the US, that provides cloud-based web development services. It allows users to create HTML5 websites and mobile sites through the use of online drag and drop tools. Along with its headquarters and other offices in Israel, Wix also has offices in Brazil, Canada, Germany, India, Ireland, Japan, Lithuania, Poland, the Netherlands, the United States, Ukraine, and Singapore.

Users can use applications for social media, e-commerce, online marketing, contact forms, e-mail marketing, and community forums to their web sites. The Wix website builder is built on a freemium business model, earning its revenues through premium upgrades. According to W3Techs, Wix is used by 2.3% of the top 10 million websites.

History

Product development
Wix was founded in 2006 by Israeli developers Avishai Abrahami, Nadav Abrahami, and Giora Kaplan. Headquartered in Tel Aviv, Wix was backed by investors Insight Venture Partners, Mangrove Capital Partners, Bessemer Venture Partners, DAG Ventures, and Benchmark Capital. The company entered an open beta phase in 2007 using a platform based on Adobe Flash.

By April 2010 Wix had 3.5 million users and raised US$10 million in Series C funding provided by Benchmark Capital and existing investors Bessemer Venture Partners and Mangrove Capital Partners. In March 2011, Wix had 8.5 million users and raised US$40 million in Series D funding, bringing its total funding to that date to US$61 million.

In June 2011, Wix launched the Facebook store module, making its first step into the social commerce trend. In March 2012, Wix launched a new HTML5 site builder, replacing the Adobe Flash technology. In October 2012, Wix launched an app market for users to sell applications built with the company's automated web development technology. Wix's software development kit lets app developers create and offer web apps to Wix users.

By August 2013, the Wix platform had more than 34 million registered users.

On 15 May 2014, Wix launched the WixHive API which allows Wix apps within a user web site to capture and share their visitor data (such as contact information, messages, purchases and bookings) with other installed apps within the same web site.

In August 2014, Wix launched Wix Hotels, a booking system for hotels, bed and breakfasts, and vacation rentals which use Wix websites. Wix Music was launched in 2015 as a platform for independent musicians to market and sell their music. Wix Restaurants was launched in 2016.

In December 2017, Wix Code, an API for adding database collections and custom JavaScript scripting, was released. In March 2020, Wix Code was re-branded to Corvid API, and then in January 2021 re-branded from Corvid to Velo, to avoid resemblance to the ongoing COVID-19 pandemic.

In December 2018, Wix launched Ascend by Wix, a suite of 20 products that lets entrepreneurs start, manage and promote a business directly from the Wix web development platform.

Wix introduced Wix Fitness, an all-in-one solution for fitness entrepreneurs to grow and promote their business and manage customer relationships in November 2019.

In February 2020, Wix unveiled Editor X, a new platform to offer advanced capabilities for designers and web agencies.

As of June 2020, with the continuous improvement to its features updates and releases, Wix claimed it had more than 180 million registered users from 190 countries around the world.

At the end of 2020, and as a result of Adobe's decision to end their support for the Flash Player, Wix stopped allowing their users to create websites in the Flash Editor as well as getting support for the Flash sites and deleting all the Flash sites, thus officially ending the life of Wix's first product.

In 2021, Wix partnered with Vistaprint and then partnered with LegalZoom a year later to better support entrepreneurs starting a business.

By 2022, the Wix platform had more than 220 million registered users worldwide.

IPO and acquisitions
On 5 November 2013, Wix had an initial public offering on NASDAQ, raising about US$127 million for the company and some share holders.

In April 2014, Wix announced the acquisition of Appixia, an Israeli startup for creating native mobile commerce (mCommerce) apps. In October 2014, Wix announced its acquisition of OpenRest, a developer of online ordering systems for restaurants.

On 23 February 2017, Wix acquired the online art community DeviantArt for US$36 million.

In February 2020, Wix acquired Inkfrog for eBay sellers to enable marketplace and sales channel integrations.

On 2 March 2021, Wix acquired SpeedETab, a Miami-based restaurant online technology provider.

In May 2021, Wix acquired Rise.ai, the gift card and customer re-engagement solution for online brands. A month later, Wix acquired Modalyst, a leading marketplace and dropshipping platform.

Description
Users must purchase premium packages to connect their sites to their own domains, remove Wix ads, access the form builder, add e-commerce capabilities, or buy extra data storage and bandwidth.

Wix provides customizable website templates and a drag-and-drop HTML5 web site builder that includes apps, graphics, image galleries, fonts, vectors, animations and other options. Users also may opt to create their web sites from scratch. In October 2013, Wix introduced a mobile editor to allow users to adjust their sites for mobile viewing.

Wix App Market offers both free and subscription-based applications, with a revenue split of 80% for the developer and 20 percent for Wix. Customers can integrate third-party applications into their own web sites, such as photograph feeds, blogging, music playlists, online community, e-mail marketing, and file management.

Custom JavaScript code can be inserted into Wix webpages using the Velo API.

Acquisitions
 Appixia: Developer of a platform for building "mCommerce" apps (acquired March 2014)
 OpenRest: Provider of online ordering and mobile solutions for restaurants (acquired October 2014)
 Moment.me: Mobile website builder for events and marketing tools for social lead generation (acquired April 2015)
 Flok: Provider of customer loyalty programs tools (acquired January 2017)
 DeviantArt: Online community for art/design creators and enthusiasts (acquired February 2017)
 InkFrog: A web design company that provides customized business management software for eBay sellers (acquired February 2020)
 SpeedETab: Restaurant online technology provider (acquired March 2021)
 Rise.ai: Gift card and customer re-engagement solution for online brands (acquired May 2021)
 Modalyst: a marketplace and dropshipping platform (acquired June 2021)

Use of WordPress code
In October 2016, there was a controversy over Wix's use of WordPress's GPL-licensed code. In response, Avishai Abrahami, Wix's CEO, published an answer explaining which open-source code was used and how Wix collaborates with the open-source community. However, it was subsequently noted that collaboration with the open-source community was not sufficient under the terms of the GPL license, which requires any code built on GPL-licensed code to be released under the same license.

Removal of activist website
On 31 May 2021, a Wix-hosted website run by exiled Hong Kong activists (2021hkcharter.com) was shut down at the request of the Hong Kong Police. This was the first known case of Hong Kong's National Security Law being used to censor content on an overseas website. Wix later apologized for "mistakenly removing the website" and reinstated the website after it had been down for four days.

References

External links

Israeli companies established in 2006
Internet properties established in 2006
Free web hosting services
Online companies of Israel
Web hosting
Web development software
Israeli inventions
Companies listed on the Nasdaq
Companies based in Tel Aviv
Israeli brands
2013 initial public offerings
Automated WYSIWYG editors
Web applications